The 31st Lambda Literary Awards were held on June 3, 2019, to honour works of LGBT literature published in 2018. The list of nominees was released on March 7.

Special awards

Nominees and winners

References

Lambda
2019 in LGBT history
Lambda Literary Awards
Lambda
2019 awards in the United States
Lists of LGBT-related award winners and nominees